Robert Edmund Cunnell (16 July 1942 – 12 January 2023) was an English cricketer. Cunnell was a right-handed batsman who bowled right-arm off break.

Cunnell made his debut for Suffolk in the 1960 Minor Counties Championship against Buckinghamshire.  Cunnell played Minor counties cricket for Suffolk from 1960 to 1979, which included 116 Minor Counties Championship appearances.  He made his List A debut against Kent in the 1966 Gillette Cup.  He made 3 further List A appearances, the last of which came against Sussex in the 1979 Gillette Cup.  In his 4 List A matches, he scored 55 runs at an average of 18.33, with a high score of 40.  With the ball, he took a single wicket which came at a cost of 28 runs.

His brother, Clifford, also played List A and Minor counties cricket for Suffolk.

Bob Cunnell died from pneumonia on 12 January 2023, at the age of 80.

References

External links
Bob Cunnell at ESPNcricinfo
Bob Cunnell at CricketArchive

1942 births
2023 deaths
Cricketers from Ipswich
English cricketers
Suffolk cricketers
Suffolk cricket captains
Deaths from pneumonia in England